Margery S. Bronster (born December 12, 1957) is a lawyer who served as Attorney General of Hawaii from 1995 to 1999.

Career
Bronster graduated from Brown University, where she became fluent in Mandarin Chinese, and then Columbia University Law School in 1982.  She went into private practice for Shearman & Sterling in New York City in litigation.  She moved to Honolulu, Hawaii in 1988 and joined the firm Carlsmith Ball Wichman Murray Case & Ichiki.  That law firm is now known as Carlsmith Ball, LLP.

In 1995 she was appointed as the first woman to hold the office of Attorney General of Hawaii for a full term.

During her tenure in the Democratic administration of Governor of Hawaii Benjamin J. Cayetano, she won the state a multibillion-dollar Master Settlement Agreement from tobacco companies. In 1997 she led an investigation into abuses by the Kamehameha Schools/Bishop Estate trustees. She was reappointed to a second term by Cayetano, but her investigation of Bishop Estate trustees caused her to fall out of favor with the Hawaii State Legislature, resulting in her failed confirmation to a second term by the state senate in 1999. She was replaced as Attorney General by Earl I. Anzai, who was formerly budget director.

Bronster then became a founding partner in the Honolulu-based Bronster Crabtree & Hoshibata, now Bronster Fujichaku Robbins. Best Lawyers in America recognized her as 2016 "Lawyer of the Year" in Honolulu, in the practice area of Insurance Litigation.

See also
 List of female state attorneys general in the United States

References

External links
 Honolulu Star-Bulletin: Who is this person who dares to go eye to eye with Bishop Estate?

Hawaii Attorneys General
Columbia Law School alumni
Women in Hawaii politics
Living people
1957 births
Brown University alumni
People associated with Shearman & Sterling
21st-century American women